The Fair Quaker of Deal or, The Humours of the Navy is a 1710 comedy play by the British writer Charles Shadwell. A popular hit running for thirteen nights, it was revived a number of times.

The original Drury Lane cast included Barton Booth as Worthy, George Pack as Mizen, George Powell as Rovewell, Thomas Elrington as Cribidge, John Corey as Easy, John Freeman as Scruple, Hester Santlow as Dorcas Zeal, Henrietta Moore as Belinda and Lucretia Bradshaw as Arabella Zeal.

The play was dedicated to "my generous and obliging friends of the County of Kent".

List of Characters 

 Flip - The Commodore, illiterate tar, hates the Gentlemen of the Navy, gets drunk with his Boats-Crew, and values himself upon the brutish Management of the Navy. 
 Mizen - a cynical Sea-Fop, a mighty reformer of the Navy, keeps a visiting day and is Flip's opposite. 
 Worthy - a Captain of the Navy, a gentleman of honour, sense and reputation.
 Rovewell - a gentleman of fortune, and true lover of the Officers of the Navy.
 Sir Charles Pleasant - Worthy's Lieutenant, a man of quality.
 Cribidge - Flip's lieutenant, a brisk young fellow.
 Easy - a Lieutenant of Marines
 Indent - Flip's purser
 Scruple - a Corporation Justice, a canting hypocrite
 Mr Norris - coxswain. 
 Arabella Zeal - bred a Churchwoman
 Dorcas Zeal - bred a Quaker
 Belinda - a woman of fortune.
 Penny Private - whore of the town
 Jiltup - whore of the town
 Maid to Arabella
 Barmaid

References

Bibliography
 Burling, William J. A Checklist of New Plays and Entertainments on the London Stage, 1700-1737. Fairleigh Dickinson Univ Press, 1992.
 Nicoll, Allardyce. A History of Early Eighteenth Century Drama: 1700-1750. CUP Archive, 1927.

1710 plays
Plays by Charles Shadwell
West End plays
Comedy plays